Peninsula Princess may refer to:

Peninsula Princess (Australia), a ferry that formerly operated in Victoria, Australia
Peninsula Princess (Canada), a ferry currently operating in New Brunswick, Canada